Bruno Hönel (born 1 April 1996) is a German politician of the Alliance 90/The Greens who has been serving as a member of the Bundestag since the 2021 German federal election.

Political career 
Hönel has been a member of the Bundestag since 2021, representing the Lübeck district. In parliament, he serves on the Budget Committee and its Subcommittee on European Affairs. In this capacity, he is his parliamentary group's rapporteur on the annual budget of the Federal Ministry of Education and Research.

Other activities 
 Nuclear Waste Disposal Fund (KENFO), Alternate Member of the Board of Trustees (since 2022)
 Association for the Taxation of Financial Transactions and for Citizens' Action (attac), Member
 German Federation for the Environment and Nature Conservation (BUND), Member
 German United Services Trade Union (ver.di), Member

References

External links 
 

Living people
1996 births
Politicians from Dresden
21st-century German politicians
Members of the Bundestag for Alliance 90/The Greens
Members of the Bundestag 2021–2025
LGBT members of the Bundestag
German LGBT politicians
Gay politicians